Walter Ancker (April 10, 1893 – February 13, 1954) was a professional baseball player whose career spanned two seasons, including one in Major League Baseball with the Philadelphia Athletics (1915). He also played in the minor leagues with the Double-A Binghamton Bingoes (1919). After his baseball career was over, he worked on the Bergen County, New Jersey Board of Chosen Freeholders.

Baseball career
Ancker has the distinction of going directly to the major leagues after making his debut with the Athletics on September 3, 1915. In his only major league season, Ancker, who was a pitcher, compiled no record with a 3.57 earned run average (ERA) in four games, one start. He did not play in the professional baseball circuit from 1916 to 1918, but made his return in 1919 with the Double-A Binghamton Bingoes of the International League. No statistics were kept for that season, but it is known that Ancker pitched two games with the Bingoes.

Political career
After his retirement from professional baseball, Ancker worked on the Board of Chosen Freeholders of Bergen County, New Jersey.

Personal
Ancker was born on April 10, 1893, in New York City to Edwin and Ancker and Augusta Goetger. Ancker had no middle name. He was married to Viola Ancker, who survived him after his death on February 13, 1954.

References
General references

Inline citations

External links

1893 births
1954 deaths
People from Bergen County, New Jersey
Politicians from New York City
Baseball players from New York City
Major League Baseball pitchers
Philadelphia Athletics players
Binghamton Bingoes players
County commissioners in New Jersey
American athlete-politicians
20th-century American politicians